Wang Hebo (1882–November 11, 1927), whose forebears had come from Taiyuan, Shanxi, born in Minhou, Fujian, joined the CPC in June 1922. He led the strike of the Tianjin–Pukou Railway workers in 1923, which effectively supported the General Strike of February 7. Later, he led labor movements in Nanjing, Shanghai, Henan and some other areas. He was one of the leaders of the Third Armed Uprising of Shanghai Workers. He took charge of the revolutionary movements of peasants and workers in the northern provinces as the secretary-general of the Northern Office of the CPC.

He was killed in Beijing on November 11, 1927.

References

1882 births
1927 deaths
20th-century executions by China
Chinese Communist Party politicians from Fujian
Delegates to the 4th National Congress of the Chinese Communist Party
Delegates to the 5th National Congress of the Chinese Communist Party
Executed people from Fujian
Executed Republic of China people
People executed by the Republic of China
People murdered in Beijing
Politicians from Fuzhou
Republic of China politicians from Fujian
Secretaries of the Central Commission for Discipline Inspection